This is a list of songs recorded and performed by Canadian Rock band Prism.

Released songs

Unreleased songs

Remixes/alternate song versions

Songs recorded and released by other artists

Prism